"Wonderchild" is a 2004 single recorded by Christian Walz.

The single was included on Walz's Paint By Numbers album, released in 2004.

Charts

Weekly charts

Year-end charts

References

2004 singles
2004 songs
Songs written by Patrik Berger (record producer)
Songs written by Christian Walz